Modern Combat: Domination is an online multiplayer first-person shooter video game developed by Gameloft for PlayStation Network and Mac.

Game Modes 

The game features a progression (rank) system in the form of experience points, awarded according to performance. The user can attain up to 72 ranks in all which increases with the level of XP (Experience Point). As the user progresses in the ranks, more weapons are unlocked to be purchased.

There can be up to 16 players on a server, i.e. up to 8 on each team. If there are odd number of real players, then a bot is added automatically to ensure an even number of team members on both sides.

This game can be played on PlayStation 3 using a DualShock 3 or PlayStation Move motion controller as well as on a Mac/OSX.

Critical reception 

GamesRadar gave this game 2.5 out of 5 stars, with praise for its low cost, graphics and variety of multiplayer modes, but criticism its mishmash game design. GameSpot gave this game a 7.0 rating praising its quick and intense matches and good range of game modes, but criticism for its long load times and lack of challenging or interesting offline mode.

References

External links 
 
 

2011 video games
Gameloft games
PlayStation 3 games
PlayStation Network games
MacOS games
Multiplayer video games
First-person shooters
Video games developed in Canada